Robert Sutherland (1830–1878) was the first known graduate of colour at a Canadian university, and the first black man to study law in North America.

Robert Sutherland may also refer to:

Robert Franklin Sutherland (1859–1922), Canadian politician and Speaker of the Canadian House of Commons
Robert Sutherland (Washington politician), American politician in the Washington House of Representatives
Robert E. Sutherland, character in The 13th Man

See also
Robert Sutherland Rattray (1881–1938), anthropologist
Robert Sutherland Telfer (born 1977), U.S. television actor